{{Infobox song
| name     = Out of Time
| cover    = Out of Time cover.jpg
| caption  = Picture sleeve for 1975 single release
| artist   = the Rolling Stones
| album    = Aftermath (UK)'
| released = * (UK)
26 June 1967 (US Flowers album version)
| recorded = March 1966
| studio   = RCA, Hollywood, California
| genre    = Pop
| length   = * (UK)
3:41 (US)
| writer   = Jagger/Richards
| label    = Decca
| producer = Andrew Loog Oldham
| tracks   = 
}}
"Out of Time" is a song by the Rolling Stones, first released on their 1966 album Aftermath (UK version). The most commercially successful version of the song was by Chris Farlowe, an English solo artist. Farlowe's single, produced by Mick Jagger, peaked at number one in the UK Singles Chart on 28 July 1966 and stayed at the top for one week. A shorter alternative mix of the Rolling Stones' recording was released in the US in 1967 on the album Flowers. A third version featuring Jagger's lead vocal and the orchestration and backing vocals from Farlowe's cover version (plus a new female backing vocal) was released on the 1975 rarities album Metamorphosis and as a single.

The song was never performed live by the Stones until June 2022, during the opening concert of their Sixty tour.

Composition and recording
The song was written by Mick Jagger and Keith Richards. Jagger produced the hit single version by Chris Farlowe.

The Rolling Stones released three versions of "Out of Time". The first, recorded by the band in Los Angeles in March 1966, appeared on the UK version of 1966's Aftermath and featured a marimba part played by Brian Jones. In this format the song was 5:37 long. A shorter version of this recording appeared in the US on 1967's Flowers, and later on 1972's More Hot Rocks (Big Hits & Fazed Cookies) and 2012's GRRR! super deluxe edition.

The song also appeared on the Stones' 1975 album Metamorphosis, which was created under the direction of former Stones manager Allen Klein and released on his ABKCO Records label. (Klein owned the rights to the pre-1971 Rolling Stones catalogue) Cash Box said it was the strongest track on Metamorphosis and said "What yesterday was a classic Stones R&B rocker has gained additional credence over the years."  This version was, in fact, the backing track from Farlowe's version, but with a Jagger lead vocal, recorded in London in April 1966 as a demo for Farlowe. The demo version was also released as a single in 1975, reaching #45 in the UK, and was later included on 1989's Singles Collection: The London Years.

56 years after its release, the Rolling Stones performed "Out of Time" live for the first time during the opening show of their 60th anniversary tour on 1 June 2022 in Madrid.

The Aftermath version of the song was featured in the opening credits of Hal Ashby's 1978 film Coming Home. The Metamorphosis version was featured, in its entirety, in Quentin Tarantino's 2019 film Once Upon a Time in Hollywood.

Chris Farlowe version

British vocalist Chris Farlowe had been active as a musician since 1957, and had been a member of a band named the Thunderbirds, where he was the frontman. However, he started going solo in 1962, releasing several singles on both Decca and Columbia Records between that year and 1964. In early 1965, Farlowe was one of the earliest artists to sign with the newly founded independent record label Immediate Records. His first release on that label was "The Fool", a song which was written by Naomi Ford and Lee Hazlewood. This release failed to chart. Following this disappointment, Farlowe started his collaboration with Jagger, who gave him a follow-up single to record: "Think", which had previously been recorded by the Rolling Stones, also for Aftermath. It reached number 37 on the UK Singles Chart.

Following the minor success of "Think", Andrew Loog Oldham was certain that the follow-up would be a hit, and once again recruited Jagger to offer him a song, with him suggesting "Out of Time" as a suitable song which Jagger and Richards had written with Farlowe in mind, believing that the song would fit his voice perfectly.

The session featured several session musicians, including Jimmy Page on guitar along with drummer Andy White and arranger Arthur Greenslade. It appeared that the session was troublesome, as Jagger was not satisfied with Greenslade's arrangement. Eventually, Jagger was satisfied with the final product, and "Out of Time" had been recorded. Farlowe's version is drastically different from the Rolling Stones Aftermath version, heavily features a string arrangement which was not utilized on the original Rolling Stones recording. In fact, the version used the same backing which Jagger previously had dubbed with his own lead vocals in a version which would be released on Metamorphosis.Immediate Records released "Out of Time" on 17 June 1966. It entered the UK Singles Chart on 23 June 1966, at a position of number 36. "Out of Time" became Farlowe's only top-10 hit, reaching number 1 on 28 July that year, where it stayed for a week. It stayed on the chart for 13 weeks, leaving on 21 September at a position of number 48. It reached number 7 on New Zealand's Listener chart and number 9 on Australia's Go-Set. The single was later featured on Farlowe's third studio album The Art of Chris Farlowe'' which was released on 25 November of that year. Nonetheless, "Out of Time" became Farlowe's biggest hit and is considered his signature song.

Personnel

Rolling Stones version 

According to authors Philippe Margotin and Jean-Michel Guesdon:

The Rolling Stones
Mick Jagger vocals, finger snaps
Keith Richards backing vocals, rhythm guitar, acoustic guitar
Brian Jones marimba, vibraphone
Bill Wyman bass
Charlie Watts drums

Additional musicians
Ian Stewart organ
Jack Nitzsche piano

Chris Farlowe version 

According to authors Andy Babiuk and Greg Prevost, except where noted:

 Chris Farlowe vocals
 Eric Ford bass
 Reg Guest piano
 Joe Moretti guitar
 Jimmy Page guitar
 Andy White drums
 Sidney Sax string arrangements

Charts

Chris Farlowe version

Notes

References

Sources

External links
Chris Farlowe Official Website

Immediate Records singles
1966 singles
1975 singles
1981 singles
UK Singles Chart number-one singles
The Rolling Stones songs
Ramones songs
Bee Gees songs
Songs written by Jagger–Richards
Song recordings produced by Andrew Loog Oldham
Song recordings produced by Mick Jagger
1966 songs
Chris Farlowe songs